This is a list of prisons within Guangxi region of the People's Republic of China.

Sources 
 

Buildings and structures in Guangxi
Guangxi